The Road to Unfreedom: Russia, Europe, America is a 2018 book by Timothy Snyder. In it, Snyder explores Russian attempts to influence Western democracies and the influence of philosopher Ivan Ilyin on Russian President Vladimir Putin and the Russian Federation in general.

Reviews
Historian Margaret MacMillan writing for The New York Times calls the book a "good wake up call", while Tim Adams in a review for The Guardian describes the book as "persuasive", "chilling and unignorable" and a review in Fair Observer calls it an "important addition to the literature explaining current events" and rising authoritarianism.

However, some other reviewers have dismissed the book as a "current liberal narrative", a paranoia "that has emerged among liberals" or a poor understanding of fascism by Snyder when he refers to the emerging far-right political forces in the United States.  

According to the WorldCat, the book has been translated into 10 languages: German, Spanish, Romanian, Russian, Korean, Dutch, Norwegian, Czech, Polish, Hungarian, Japanese, and also in Finnish and Croatian. It was translated into Ukrainian in 2020.

References

2018 non-fiction books
Books about the United States
Books about Europe
Books about Russia
Tim Duggan Books books